is a Japanese tennis player. Naito has been ranked as high as world No. 169 in singles and No. 224 in doubles by the Women's Tennis Association (WTA). In November 2016, she won the doubles tournament of the Ando Securities Open in Tokyo, partnering Rika Fujiwara. The pair defended their title the following year.

On the ITF Junior Circuit, Naito's career-high ranking is world No. 15.

Performance timeline
Only main-draw results in WTA Tour, Grand Slam tournaments, Fed Cup/Billie Jean King Cup and Olympic Games are included in win–loss records.

Singles 
Current after the 2022 Toray Pan Pacific Open.

ITF Circuit finals

Singles: 13 (6 titles, 7 runner-ups)

Doubles: 9 (5 titles, 4 runner-ups)

Junior Grand Slam finals

Doubles: 1 (runner-up)

Notes

References

External links
 
 

2001 births
Living people
Japanese female tennis players
People from Niigata (city)
Tennis players at the 2018 Summer Youth Olympics
Youth Olympic gold medalists for Japan
21st-century Japanese women